James Looney Jr. (born August 18, 1957) is a former American football linebacker who played one season with the San Francisco 49ers of the National Football League. He played college football at Purdue University and attended Crenshaw High School in Los Angeles, California. Looney was also a member of the Arizona Wranglers and Chicago Blitz of the United States Football League. He was a member of the San Francisco 49ers team that won Super Bowl XVI.

References

External links
Just Sports Stats
Fanbase profile

Living people
1957 births
Players of American football from Louisiana
American football linebackers
Purdue Boilermakers football players
San Francisco 49ers players
Arizona Wranglers players
Chicago Blitz players
People from Bastrop, Louisiana
Crenshaw High School alumni
Players of American football from Los Angeles